No Secrets may refer to:

 No Secrets (band), an American-British girl group
 No Secrets (No Secrets album), the self-titled debut and only album by No Secrets
 No Secrets (Carly Simon album), pop/folk singer-songwriter Carly Simon's third studio album, released in 1972
 No Secrets (EP), released by county singer-songwriter Barry Zito in 2017
 A Touch of the Sun (1979 film), also known as No Secrets
 No Secrets (adult protection), a UK Government publication guidance
 No Secrets (charity), Registered Charity no. 1153683
 No Secrets (2013 book), a 2013 book by Anuj Dhar
 "No Secrets" (song), a 1980 song by The Angels
 Too many secrets, from the 1992 film Sneakers.